Anita Takura is a Ghanaian Agricultural and Environmental Science academic. Takura received the 2013 L'Oreal UNESCO fellows award.

References

Year of birth missing (living people)
Living people
Ghanaian academics
Place of birth missing (living people)